Druzhba is a rural locality (a selo) in Kayakentsky District, Republic of Dagestan, Russia. The population was 3,675 as of 2010. There are 38 streets.

Geography 
Druzhba is located 23 km south of Novokayakent (the district's administrative centre) by road. Dzhemikent and Krasnopartizansk are the nearest rural localities.

Nationalities 
Dargins, Tabasarans. Aghuls, Lezgins and Kumyks live there.

References 

Rural localities in Kayakentsky District